15 Éxitos Vol. 3 is a compilation album by Mexican group Los Caminantes, released in 1987 on Luna Records. It is the third of a three volume greatest hits collection from their Corridos Al Estilo De Los Caminantes, Porque Tengo Tu Amor, Cada Dia Mejor, and De Guanajuato...Para America! albums.

Track listing

References
Allmusic page
 

1987 compilation albums
Los Caminantes compilation albums
Spanish-language compilation albums